The Columbia County Courthouse is located at Court Square in the heart of Magnolia, the county seat of Columbia County, Arkansas.  The two-story brick and stone structure was designed W. W. Hall and built in 1905.  It features Renaissance Revival styling, with Corinthian pilasters separating the windows on the second level and a projecting Greek temple portico with recessed entries under round arches on the first level, and fluted Corinthian columns on the second.

African-American man, Jordan Jameson was lynched on November 11, 1919, in the town square right in the front of the Columbia County Courthouse. A large white mob seized Jameson after he allegedly shot the local sheriff. They tied him to a stake and burned him alive meters from the building.

The building was listed on the National Register of Historic Places in 1978.

See also
National Register of Historic Places listings in Columbia County, Arkansas

References

 - Total pages: 368 

Courthouses on the National Register of Historic Places in Arkansas
Government buildings completed in 1905
County courthouses in Arkansas
National Register of Historic Places in Columbia County, Arkansas
Historic district contributing properties in Arkansas
1905 establishments in Arkansas
Renaissance Revival architecture in Arkansas
Magnolia, Arkansas